Alumni Field is an outdoor football, rugby and soccer stadium located at York University's Keele Campus in Toronto, Ontario, Canada. It is the former home of the York Lions. The stadium was known as York Stadium prior to 2017.  The Toronto Arrows split its home games at Alumni Field and Lamport Stadium during its inaugural 2019 Major League Rugby season.

History

Prior to 1995 the site was a grass field and the then Yeomen football team played home games at Esther Shiner Stadium at Bathurst Street and Finch Avenue.

There is a small bleacher seating 2,500 spectators and an enclosed booth for broadcasting/scorekeeping, concessions, washrooms and changerooms.

In 2013, the stadium's grass surface was replaced with FieldTurf.

It was planned to be the temporary home of the Canadian Premier League's York9 FC in the beginning of their inaugural 2019 season as they renovate their future home at York Lions Stadium. However, it was announced prior to the 2019 season that all games would be played at York Lions Stadium.

Rugby union

International matches

Toronto Arrows

The Toronto Arrows split their home games at Alumni Field of York University and Lamport Stadium during their inaugural 2019 MLR season.  They were scheduled to play games at the stadium in 2020, but the season was canceled due to the COVID-19 pandemic.  The team moved their home games to York Lions Stadium for the 2022 season.

References

External links
 York University Alumni Field

Sports venues in Toronto
Canadian football venues in Ontario
York University buildings
University sports venues in Canada
Rugby union stadiums in Ontario
Major League Rugby stadiums
Soccer venues in Ontario
Sports venues completed in 1995
1995 establishments in Ontario
Toronto Arrows
Toronto Arrows stadiums